Tunis Run is a tributary of White Deer Creek in Centre County, Pennsylvania, in the United States. The stream is situated near Hough Gap and a railroad was once built near it. Wild trout naturally reproduce within it.

Course
Tunis Run begins in a valley between McCall Mountain and Hough Mountain in Miles Township. It flows west for a few tenths of a mile before receiving an unnamed tributary from the left and turning north and then north-northeast, flowing through a valley between McCall Mountain and Hall Mountain. After several tenths of a mile, the stream receives an unnamed tributary from the right and turns north-northwest for a few tenths of a mile, leaving its valley. It then turns northeast. Several tenths of a mile further downstream, the stream reaches its confluence with White Deer Creek.

Tributaries
Tunis Run has no named tributaries. However, it does have two unnamed tributaries.

Geography and geology

Tunis Run is situated near Hough Gap.

Watershed
The mouth of the stream is in the United States Geological Survey quadrangle of Loganton. However, its source is in the quadrangle of Woodward. The mouth of the stream is located near Loganton.

History
Tunis Run was entered into the Geographic Names Information System on August 2, 1979. Its identifier in the Geographic Names Information System is 1189919.

A short branch of a railroad was once in the vicinity of Tunis Run.

Biology
Wild trout naturally reproduce in Tunis Run from its headwaters downstream to its mouth.

It was surveyed on June 26, 2013 and on January 20, 2015, it was listed as being considered for designation as wild trout waters.

See also
Cowbell Hollow, next tributary of White Deer Creek going downstream
List of rivers of Pennsylvania

References

Rivers of Centre County, Pennsylvania
Tributaries of White Deer Creek
Rivers of Pennsylvania